Advanced maternal age, in a broad sense, is the instance of a woman being of an older age at a stage of reproduction, although there are various definitions of specific age and stage of reproduction. The variability in definitions  is in part explained by the effects of increasing age occurring as a continuum rather than as a threshold effect.

Average age of first childbirth has been increasing, especially in OECD countries, among which the highest average age is 32.6 (South Korea) followed by 32.1 (Ireland and Spain). In a number of European countries (Spain), the mean age of women at first childbirth has crossed the 30 year threshold. This process is not restricted to Europe. Asia, Japan and the United States are all seeing average age at first birth on the rise, and increasingly the process is spreading to countries in the developing world such as China, Turkey and Iran. In the U.S., the average age of first childbirth was 26.9 in 2018.

Advanced maternal age is associated with adverse reproductive effects such as increased risk of infertility, and that the children have chromosomal abnormalities. The corresponding paternal age effect is less pronounced.

History 
Having children later was not exceptional in the past, when families were larger and women often continued bearing children until the end of their reproductive age. What is so radical about this recent transformation is that it is the age at which women give birth to their first child, which is becoming comparatively high, leaving an ever more constricted window of biological opportunity for second and subsequent children, should they be desired. Unsurprisingly, high first-birth ages and high rates of birth postponement are associated with the arrival of low, and lowest-low fertility.

This association has now become especially clear, since the postponement of first births in a number of countries has now continued unabated for more than three decades and has become one of the most prominent characteristics of fertility patterns in developed societies. A variety of authors (in particular, Lesthaeghe) have argued that fertility postponement constitutes the "hallmark" of what has become known as the “second demographic transition”.

Others have proposed that the postponement process itself constitutes a separate "third transition". On this latter view, modern developed societies exhibit a kind of dual fertility pattern, with the majority of births being concentrated either among very young or increasingly older mothers. This is sometimes known as the "rectangularisation" of fertility patterns.

Examples 
In the USA, the average age at which women bore her first child advanced from 21.4 years old in 1970 to 26.9 in 2018.

The German Federal Institute for Population Research claimed in 2015 the percentage for women with an age of at least 35 giving birth to a child was 25.9%. This figure rose from 7.6% in 1981.

Possible factors that influence childbearing age
There are many factors that may influence childbearing age in women, although they are mostly correlations without certain causations. For instance, older maternal age at first childbirth is associated with higher educational attainment and income.

Two studies show that generous parental leave allowances in Britain encourage young motherhood and that parental-leave allowance reduces postponement in Sweden.

Effects

Decreased fertility 

A woman's fertility peaks lasts during the twenties and first half of thirties, after which it starts to decline, with advanced maternal age causing an increased risk of female infertility.

According to Henri Leridon, PhD, an epidemiologist with the French Institute of Health and Medical Research, of women trying to get pregnant, without using fertility drugs or in vitro fertilization:
 At age 30
 75% will have a conception ending in a live birth within one year
 91% will have a conception ending in a live birth within four years.
 At age 35
 66% will have a conception ending in a live birth  within one year
 84% will have a conception ending in a live birth within four years.
 At age 40
 44% will have a conception ending in a live birth  within one year
 64% will have a conception ending in a live birth within four years.

Risk of birth defects 

A woman's risk of having a baby with chromosomal abnormalities increases with her age. Down syndrome is the most common chromosomal birth defect, and a woman's risk of having a baby with Down syndrome is:
 At age 20, 1 in 2000
 At age 24, 1 in 1300
 At age 25, 1 in 1200
 At age 29, 1 in 950
 At age 30, 1 in 900
 At age 34, 1 in 450
 At age 35, 1 in 350
 At age 39, 1 in 150
 At age 40, 1 in 100
 At age 44, 1 in 40
 At age 45, 1 in 30
 At age 49, 1 in 10

Other effects 
Advanced maternal age is associated with adverse outcomes in the perinatal period, which may be caused by detrimental effects on decidual and placental development.

The risk of the mother dying before the child becomes an adult increases by more advanced maternal age, such as can be demonstrated by the following data from France in 2007:

The above table is not to be confused with maternal mortality.

Advanced maternal age continues to be associated with a range of adverse pregnancy outcomes including low birth weight, pre-term birth, stillbirth, unexplained fetal death, and increased rates of Caesarean section. However, over time, improvements in (and improvements in access to) medical services and social resources have decreased the negative association between older maternal age and low birth weight.

On the other hand, advanced maternal age is associated with a more stable family environment, higher socio-economic position, higher income and better living conditions, as well as better parenting practices (including better disciplinary methods). A qualitative study on couples in the United States who used in-vitro fertilization to conceive their first child when the woman was aged 40 or older at the time of delivery found that 72% of the women and 57% of the men believed that they had enhanced emotional preparedness for parenting which benefitted both their children and themselves. In quantitative studies, mother’s older age at first birth has been associated with increases in children’s psychiatric health, language skills, cognitive ability, and fewer social and emotional difficulties. Further, a study in the United Kingdom showed that older maternal age at first birth was associated with fewer hospital admissions and fewer unintentional injuries for children up to age 5 and a greater likelihood of having had all of their immunizations by 9 months of age– all outcomes used as indicators of child wellbeing in reports from the World Health Organisation. Finally, although older maternal age doesn’t necessarily imply older paternal age, researchers have suggested links between older paternal age and improved child outcomes, including increased IQ and educational attainment and increased telomeric length, which is associated with greater longevity. However, it is more or less uncertain whether these entities are effects of advanced maternal age, are contributors to advanced maternal age, or common effects of a certain state such as personality type.

Changes in interpregnancy interval 
Kalberer et al. have shown that despite the older maternal age at birth of the first child, the time span between the birth of the first and the second child (the interpregnancy interval) decreased over the last decades. If purely biological factors were at work, it could be argued that interpregnancy interval should have increased, as fertility declines with age, which would make it harder for the woman to get a second child after postponed birth of the first one. This not being the case shows that sociologic factors (see above) prime over biological factors in determining interpregnancy interval.

With technology developments cases of post-menopausal pregnancies have occurred, and there are several known cases of older women carrying a pregnancy to term, usually with in vitro fertilization of a donor egg.  A 61-year-old Brazilian woman, aided by the implantation of a donor egg, gave birth to twins in October 2012.

Ovarian aging 

As women age, they experience a decline in reproductive performance leading to menopause.  This decline is tied to a decline in the number of ovarian follicles.   Although about 1 million oocytes are present at birth in the human ovary, only about 500 (about 0.05%) of these ovulate, and the rest do not (ovarian follicle atresia).  The decline in ovarian reserve appears to occur at a constantly increasing rate with age, and leads to nearly complete exhaustion of the reserve by about age 51.  As ovarian reserve and fertility decline with age, there is also a parallel increase in pregnancy failure and meiotic errors resulting in chromosomally abnormal conceptions.

Titus et al. have proposed an explanation for the decline in ovarian reserve with age.  They showed that as women age, double-strand breaks accumulate in the DNA of their primordial follicles.  Primordial follicles are immature primary oocytes surrounded by a single layer of granulosa cells.  An enzyme system is present in oocytes that normally accurately repairs DNA double-strand breaks.  This repair system is referred to as homologous recombinational repair, and it is especially active during meiosis.  Meiosis is the general process by which germ cells are formed in eukaryotes, and it appears to be an adaptation for efficiently removing damages in germ line DNA by homologous recombinational repair (see Origin and function of meiosis).  Human primary oocytes are present at an intermediate stage of meiosis, that is prophase I (see Oogenesis).  Titus et al. also showed that expression of four key DNA repair genes that are necessary for homologous recombinational repair (BRCA1, MRE11, Rad51 and ATM) decline in oocytes with age.  This age-related decline in ability to repair double-strand damages can account for the accumulation of these damages, which then likely contributes to the decline in ovarian reserve.

Women with an inherited mutation in the DNA repair gene BRCA1 undergo menopause prematurely, suggesting that naturally occurring DNA damages in oocytes are repaired less efficiently in these women, and this inefficiency leads to early reproductive failure.  Genomic data from about 70,000 women were analyzed to identify protein-coding variation associated with age at natural menopause.  Pathway analyses identified a major association with DNA damage response genes, particularly those expressed during meiosis and including a common coding variant in the BRCA1 gene.

See also 
 Age and female fertility
 Childlessness
 Fertility factor (demography)
 List of countries by age at first marriage
 Pregnancy over age 50
 Teenage pregnancy

References

Citations

General sources

Further reading 
 Charlemagne, 9 February 2006, "The Fertility Bust", The Economist

External links 
 Postponement of childbearing and low fertility in Europe Power Point presentation by Tomas Sobotka
 InterNational Council on Infertility Information Dissemination

Fertility
Midwifery
Motherhood